A cooking apple or culinary apple is an apple that is used primarily for cooking, as opposed to a dessert apple, which is eaten raw. Cooking apples are generally larger, and can be tarter than dessert varieties. Some varieties have a firm flesh that does not break down much when cooked. Culinary varieties with a high acid content produce froth when cooked, which is desirable for some recipes. Britain grows a large range of apples specifically for cooking.  Worldwide, dual-purpose varieties (for both cooking and eating raw) are more widely grown.

Apples can be cooked down into sauce, apple butter, or fruit preserves. They can be baked in an oven and served with custard, and made into pies or apple crumble. In the UK roast pork is commonly served with cold apple sauce made from boiled and mashed apples.

A baked apple is baked in an oven until it has become soft. The core is usually removed and the resulting cavity stuffed with fruits, brown sugar, raisins, or cinnamon, and sometimes a liquor such as brandy. An apple dumpling adds a pastry crust.

John Claudius Loudon wrote in 1842:

History 
Popular cooking apples in US, in the late 19th century. Tart: Duchess of Oldenburg, Fallawater, Gravenstein,  Horse, Keswick Codlin, Red Astrachan, Rhode Island Greening,  Tetofsky. Sweet: Golden Sweet, Maverack Sweet, Peach Pound Sweet, Tolman Sweet and Willis Sweet. 
Popular cooking apples in the early 20th century´s England: Alfriston, Beauty of Kent, Bismark,  Bramley, Cox Pomona, Dumelow, Ecklinville, Emneth Early, Golden Noble, Grenadier, Lord Grosvenor, Lord Derby, Newton Wonder, Stirling Castle,  Warners King.

Cooking apple cultivars
D = Dual purpose ( table + cooking). Cooking result P = Puree K = Keeps Shape

 Alfriston P
 Allington K
 Annie Elizabeth K
 Antonovka P
 Arthur Turner P
 Baldwin
 Ballyfatten
 Bancroft
 Baron Ward
 Beacon
 Beauty of Kent P
 Belle de Boskoop K
 Bismarck apple P
 Black Amish – also consumed as an eating apple
 Black Twig D
 Blenheim Orange P - K
 Bloody Ploughman
 Bountiful
 Braeburn K
 Bramley P
 Crab apple (primarily for jelly)
 Burr Knot P
 Byflett Seedling P
 Byford Wonder K
 Calville Blanc d'hiver K
 Calville Rouge d´automne K
 Calville Rouge d´hiver P
 Campanino
 Carlisle Codlin P
 Carolina Red June
 Carter's Blue
 Catshead P
 Cellini P
 Charles Ross K
 Chelmsford Wonder P
 Cockle Pippin P
 Colloggett Pippin P - K
 'Cortland' D
 Coul Blush
 Cox Pomona P - K
 Custard
 Danziger Kantapfel K
 Duchess of Oldenburg
 Dudley Winter
 Dumelow's Seedling P
 Edward VII P
 Emneth Early
 Esopus Spitzenburg D
 Fallawater
 Flower of Kent
 Galloway K
 Gennet Moyle
 George Neal
 Glockenapfel
 Ginger Gold
 Golden Noble
 Golden Pippi
 Golden Reinette P - K
 Golden Sweet
 Gragg
 Gravenstein
 Granny Smith – also consumed as an eating apple
 Greenup´s Pippin P
 Grenadier
 Hambledon Deux Ans P - K
 Harrison Cider Apple
 Hawthornden P
 Howgate Wonder K
 Irish Peach
 Isaac Newton
 James Grieve – also consumed as an eating apple
 Jonathan – also consumed as an eating apple
 Jumbo
 Keswick Codlin P
 King of the Pippins K D
 Landsberger Reinette
 Lane's Prince Albert P
 Lodi
 Lord Derby P
 Lowell
 Maiden Blush
 Malinda
 McIntosh – also consumed as an eating apple
 My Jewel
 Newell-Kimzey (aka Airlie Red Flesh)
 Newton Wonder P
 Nickajack
 Norfolk Biffin K
 Northern greening
 Northern Spy
 Oldenburg
 Paulared D
 Peasgood's Nonsuch P - K
 Pink Lady – also consumed as an eating apple
 Pinova
 Porter's
 Pott's Seedling
 Pumpkin Sweet apple
 Queen P
 Red Astrachan
 Red Prince
 Reverend W. Wilks P
 Rhode Island Greening
 Rome Beauty
 Sandow
 Scotch Bridget
 Scotch Dumpling
 Schoolmaster P
 Stirling Castle P
 Smokehouse
 Snow apple (aka Fameuse) 
 Spartan
 Stayman
 Stirling Castle P
 Surprise K
 Tetofsky
 Tickled Pink
 Tolman Sweet
 Tom Putt
 Topaz
 Transparante de Croncels K
 Twenty Ounce K
 Wagener
 Warner's King P
 Wealthy D
 White Melrose
 White Transparent
 Winesap K D
 Wolf River  K
 York Imperial D

See also

 Apple pie
 List of apple cultivars
 List of apple dishes

References

Apples
Apple dishes
Baked foods